La Doña is a 2011 Chilean telenovela produced and broadcast by Chilevisión.

Cast

Main cast 
 Claudia Di Girólamo as Catalina de los Ríos y Lisperguer
 Juan Falcón as gobernador Cristobal Garcia de Leon
 Ricardo Fernández as capitán Fernando Garcia de Leon
 Cristián Carvajal as Fray Domingo de Figueroa
 Fernanda Urrejola as Millaray Erazo-Lisperguer
 Felipe Contreras as indio Nahuel
 Sofía García as Rosario Lisperguer y Saavedra

Supporting cast 
 Alfredo Castro as regidor Pedro Lisperguer y Solorzano
 Luz Jiménez as Agueda Lisperguer
 José Soza as Gonzalo de los Rios
 Catalina Pulido as Perpetua Ximenez de Mendoza
 Paloma Moreno as Isadora Ximenez de Mendoza
 Felipe Ponce as Martin Ximenez de Mendoza
 Alejandro Goic as Juan de la Cruz
 Rodrigo Pérez as Asencio Erazo
 Roxana Campos as Aileen Chalco
 Antonio Campos as Nicolas Villarreal
 Javiera Hernández as Beatriz Ferreiro
 José Rodríguez as Daniel Ferreiro
 Pablo Krögh as cardenal Benigno Martinez de Oviedo
 Nathalia Aragonese as India Ancavilo
 Claudio Castellón as indio Manuncahua

Guest appearances 
Sergio Hernández as Antonio Ximénez de Mendoza
 Alessandra Guerzoni as Elena Saavedra de Guzmán
 Paulo Brunetti as capitán Enrique Enríquez
 Hugo Medina as oídor Machado de Chávez
 Eduardo Soto as oídor Gaspar de Núñez

References

2011 telenovelas
2012 telenovelas
Spanish-language telenovelas
Chilevisión telenovelas